The Everest Curling Challenge was a made-for-TV curling tournament that was held August 25 to 27, 2017 at the Willie O'Ree Place in Fredericton, New Brunswick. The event featured a grand prize of $200,000 for the winning team, the largest curling cash prize in curling history.

The event featured eight mixed curling teams made up of the best men's and women's teams in Canada. The teams were selected in a draft by the eight skips invited to the event, Chelsea Carey, John Epping, Brad Gushue, Rachel Homan, Brad Jacobs, Jennifer Jones, Kevin Koe and Val Sweeting.  All games were televised on TSN.

A new rule was incorporated into the event; if at the end of an end, a team had a rock completely covering the button, that team would score an extra point.

In the final, Gushue and his chosen rink of Cathy Overton-Clapham, E. J. Harnden and Lisa Weagle defeated Epping and his team of Kaitlyn Lawes, Brent Laing and Rachelle Brown by a score of 6-5.

According to event organizers, the event was sold out.

Teams

Bracket

Scores

Quarterfinals
Friday, August 25, 7:30 pm

Saturday, August 26, 10:00 am

Saturday, August 26, 2:00 pm

Saturday, August 26, 7:30 pm

Semifinals
Saturday, August 26, 11:00 am

Saturday, August 26, 3:00 pm

Final
Sunday, August 27, 7:30 pm

References

External links
Official site

2017 in Canadian curling
Curling competitions in Fredericton
2017 in New Brunswick
The Sports Network